Dato' Dr. Fauziah binti Mohamad Taib (born 26 March 1955) is a Malaysian diplomat and published author. She was previously the Ambassador to the Kingdom of the Netherlands, a post she held from 13 August 2008 until her retirement in 2015. She also served as the Permanent Representative of Malaysia to the Organisation for the Prohibition of Chemical Weapons (OPCW), which is based in The Hague.

Fauziah has written extensively on a variety of topics of interest to the diplomat. Her first published work, titled Malaysia and UNCED: An Analysis of A Diplomatic Process was published under Kluwer Law International in 1989 and remains a reference for the diplomatic negotiation process. Since then, she has authored or edited no less than ten other books, including editing the best-selling Number One, Wisma Putra, a collection of short stories from Malaysian Ambassadors of their lives on the road. Her latest book, At the OPCW: A Story of Malaysia's Interventions, was launched by the OPCW Director General in March 2015.

In 2005, Fauziah was appointed as the Director General of the Institute of Diplomacy and Foreign Relations, the training arm of the Ministry of Foreign Affairs (Malaysia). It was during her tenure at the Institute that she instituted major changes to the diplomatic syllabus, tailoring the courses to the relevant diplomatic skills needed for a 21st-century diplomat. She advocated for a more interactive mode of training, preferring simulation and discussions, over lectures and talks.

She published a number of books while at the Institute, and helped others to publish as well, strengthening the publication mandate of the Institute. Her writing skills were also employed by the Minister of Foreign Affairs during this time as his lead speech-writer. She is known for her strength in substantive issues as well as a flair for the written word.

As Permanent Representative to the OPCW, Fauziah represented Malaysia in two Executive Council terms, even successfully co-facilitating on the difficult and controversial question of the OPCW’s inspection methodology. When the OPCW was awarded the Nobel Peace Prize for 2013, there was no question that Fauziah would be among the handful of state representatives travelling to Oslo for the ceremony.
In the Netherlands, Fauziah discovered a talent for painting and held her first exhibition at The Hague in 2012.

Fauziah is an avid traveller – an interest she developed after spending the summer of her graduation in 1977 backpacking and trekking across the continental USA.

Early life and education 

Fauziah was born on 26 March 1955 in Negeri Sembilan, Malaysia. The youngest of nine siblings, Fauziah grew up in a household with a stay-at-home mother and a civil servant father.

She studied International Relations at the University of Malaya (1974–1977), l'Université de Paris 1 (Panthéon-Sorbonne)/L'Institut International d'Administration Publique, Paris, (1985–1986) and the University of Kent at Canterbury (1994–1996). It took her only 18 months to complete, and be awarded, a PhD in International Relations from the University of Kent at Canterbury.

Career
Fauziah Mohd. Taib joined the Malaysian Civil Service in 1978. She began her career as an Assistant Director at the Implementation Coordination Unit of the Prime Minister's Department, handling national development and women issues.

In 1983 she joined the Ministry of Foreign Affairs and was assigned to the Europe Division before being posted to the Embassy of Malaysia in Belgium in 1988. It was during her three-year stint in Brussels that she witnessed the establishment of the European Single Market and the fall of the Berlin Wall.

She returned to the Ministry in 1991 and was promoted to Principal Assistant Secretary in Economic Division, where her work took her to participate in numerous United Nations and other multilateral meetings, including that of the UN on Women in Development, UNCED Prep. Com. Meetings and the Earth Summit in Rio (Brazil); the UN General Assembly; the Non-Aligned Movement, the Summits of the Group of 15 Developing Countries (G15) and ASEAN Regional Meetings.

By 1993, Fauziah was co-ordinating East Europe affairs at the Ministry and monitoring Malaysia's participation with SFOR and UNPROFOR during the Bosnian crisis. She attended numerous UN meetings for the Reconstruction of Bosnia and Herzegovina (Brussels) and visited Bosnia-Herzegovina several times during the reconstruction period.

In September 1994, Fauziah took a two-year sabbatical to continue her post-graduate doctoral studies under the sponsorship of the Federal Government. Upon her return with a PhD in August 1996, she served the Prime Minister's special envoy on a mission to the Sudan and South Africa.

Fauziah's passion for training and developing young minds led her to an appointment as the Director General of the Institute of Diplomacy and Foreign Relations (IDFR) where she began the painstaking process of revamping the diplomatic syllabus to fit the needs of a new diplomatic world. She continued publishing books while at IDFR and opened the windows of the diplomatic service to the world of publication.

Her next stint, as Director General for the newly established Policy and Strategy Planning within the Ministry of Foreign Affairs, found Fauziah at the forefront of a number of new initiatives for the government. One of her papers, commissioned by the Foreign Minister, argued for a specific legal department within the Ministry, and led to the creation of the Ministry's Department of Research, Treaties and International Law. She was also a member of the Malaysian team to the International Court of Justice on the legal dispute of Pulau Batu Puteh, Middle Rocks and South Ledge between Malaysia and Singapore.

Fauziah's other overseas postings include as Deputy Chief of Mission in Washington, D.C. and Ambassador to Fiji (with concurrent accreditation to Nauru, Tonga, Kiribati, and Tuvalu), before being assigned as Ambassador to the Netherlands.

MH17 Crisis Management 

On 17 July 2014, Malaysia Airlines flight MH17, en route from Amsterdam to Kuala Lumpur, was shot down in rebel-held Ukrainian territory, near the Ukrainian-Russian border. A total of 283 passengers and 15 crew members from ten different countries were on board the ill-fated plane when it crashed. The majority of the passengers were Dutch.

When the human remains of flight MH17 were brought back to the Netherlands for the post-mortem process, Fauziah Mohd. Taib was appointed as her country's lead focal point, heading Malaysia's Joint Operations Centre in The Hague to oversee the repatriation of victims to their home country. As Ambassador, she also liaised with the Dutch government on matters related to the downed aircraft.

Fauziah's interviews on several TV stations in the Netherlands as well as that of Malaysia, made her the 'face' of the MH17 crisis management operations in the Netherlands.

Publications

Books 
Malaysia and UNCED: An Analysis of a Diplomatic Process: 1989 – 1992 (Kluwer Law International,1997) 
A Diplomat Arrives in Washington (USA,2003) /-3
Rumah Malaysia, Suva: The Official Residence of the High Commissioner (Fiji, 2004) 
Selected Foreign Policy Speeches by Syed Hamid Albar (Editor) (Malaysia, 2005) 
The Making of the ASEAN Summit (Malaysia, 2006) 
Number One, Wisma Putra (Editor) (Malaysia, 2006) /11-4
Manual of Procedures for Wisma Putra Officers (Editor) (Malaysia, 2007)
Letta, Corrado. Malaysia-Europe Strategic Partnership for the Pacific Century. Edited by Fauziah Mohd Taib (Malaysia, 2008) 
Brushwork Odyssey in Malaysia: A Dutch Retelling (Editor) (Netherlands, 2009) 
Letta, Corrado. Integration Geopolitics: East Asia vs Latin America (Edited by Fauziah Mohd Taib) (Peru, 2010) 
 All Things Malaysian (Editor) (Netherlands, 2011) 
At the OPCW: A Story of Malaysia's Interventions (the Netherlands, 2015)

Journal 
Journal of Diplomacy and Foreign Relations (JDFR Malaysia) – Editor in Chief, 2005–2007

Commemorative Magazine 
Wisma Putra @ 50: 1957–2007 – Editor in Chief

Articles / Papers 
"Creativity in Malaysia's Foreign Policy" in INTAN. 1989.
"Ethics in Malaysia's Foreign Policy" in JDFR. 2006.
"Privatising Diplomacy: The Way Forward”, in Managing Diplomats’ Networks and Optimizing Value by Kishan Rana and Jova Kurbalija (DiploFoundation, Malta). 2007.
"Malaysia's Foreign Policy After 2020: In Search of a Niche" (Paper presented at the 8th Heads of Missions Conference, Kuala Lumpur) 2014.

References

1955 births
Living people
University of Malaya alumni
Alumni of the University of Kent
People from Negeri Sembilan
Malaysian people of Malay descent
Malaysian women diplomats
Malaysian novelists
Permanent Representatives of Malaysia to the Organisation for the Prohibition of Chemical Weapons
Ambassadors of Malaysia to the Netherlands
High Commissioners of Malaysia to Fiji
High Commissioners of Malaysia to Nauru
High Commissioners of Malaysia to Tonga
High Commissioners of Malaysia to Kiribati
High Commissioners of Malaysia to Tuvalu
Malaysian women ambassadors